Room 13 is a Gothic-horror children's novel written by the acclaimed award-winning children's author Robert Swindells. Published in 1989, it was awarded the Red House Children's Book Award. The novel centres around a group of friends on a school trip, who stay in a creepy guest house on Whitby's West Cliff.

Plot summary
Fliss Morgan has a nightmare on the night before her school trip, to Whitby. Every night Ellie-May Sunderland is drawn to the landing outside the mysterious Room 13, which does not seem to exist during the day. Fliss and her friends attempt to unravel the mystery of the room, and determine the identity of its sinister inhabitant.

Characters 

Felicity "Fliss" Morgan: The main character. Fliss begins observing strange events in the hotel at night, and becomes determined to get to the bottom of what is going on.

Lisa Watmoug: she is a  very naughty girl

Ellie-May Sunderland :''she is a very naughty girlDavid "Trot" Trotter: A loudmouthed boyGary Bazzard: One of Trot's friendsMr. Hepworth: A teacherMrs. Marriott: A loud military style teacher.Sall Haggerlythe:''' An elderly woman who sits in the bus shelter near the children's hotel, and is widely believed to be insane.

References

1989 British novels
English Gothic novels
British horror novels
Novels set in Whitby
Dracula novels
Novels set in hotels
Doubleday (publisher) books